The St. Louis Limestone is a large geologic formation covering a wide area of the midwest of the United States. It is named after an exposure at St. Louis, Missouri. It consists of sedimentary limestone with scattered chert beds, including the heavily chertified Lost River Chert Bed in the Horse Cave Member. It is exposed at the surface through western Kentucky and Middle Tennessee, including the city of Clarksville, Tennessee. The limestone deposit is Mississippian in age, in the Meramecian series, roughly 330-340 million years old.

Fossils commonly found in the St. Louis include the rugosan corals Lithostrotion and Lithostrotionella and the bryozoan Fenestrellina.

See also
List of types of limestone

References

Limestone formations of the United States
Mississippian United States
Carboniferous Kentucky
Carboniferous Missouri
Carboniferous geology of Virginia
Carboniferous geology of Tennessee
Mississippian Illinois
Carboniferous southern paleotropical deposits